Margot Walter, also known as Margot Landa (4 October 1903 in Potsdam, Germany – April 1994 in Camden Town, London, England), was a German actress.

Life and career 
Born in Potsdam near Berlin Walter became a regular member of the cast at the Hamburg Stadttheater in 1923. After a season at the Thalia Theater in Hamburg she moved to Berlin in 1925 after being contracted by the Deutsches Künstlertheater Berlin (German Artist Theatre Berlin), one of the several Berlin theatres run by successful Jewish theatrical producer . Her usual characters were the ingenue and the soubrette.

The following year (1926) her film career started when she was discovered by Reinhold Schünzel. Margot Walter played mainly happy-go-lucky teenage girls in comedies, romantic comedies and farces which were constantly on an insignificant artistic level. Those were topics popular with the audience during the period of radical change from silent to sound movies. Margot Walter contracted leading and main supporting roles.

Married to Jewish silent movie star Max Landa, 30 years her elder, her career came to a sudden end in January 1933 when the Nazi Party took over the government in Germany. The couple went into exile where her husband committed suicide the same year. As Margot Landa the young widow settled down in England, where she had worked already in 1928. Her last film appearance was in the British production Night Alone in 1938. Warwick Ward, the producer of Night Alone, knew her from Berlin where he had worked as an actor.

In spring 1994 Margot Landa died in Camden Town.

A different Margot Walter (born 1924) worked exclusively as stage actress, e.g. in Ingolstadt}, Germany in the 1950s.

Filmography 
 1926: We'll Meet Again in the Heimat
 1927: Babette Bomberling
 1927: Always Be True and Faithful 
 1928:  Endangered Girls 
 1928: Honeymoon
 1928: Ringing the Changes
 1929: Möblierte Zimmer 
 1929: Do You Know That Little House on Lake Michigan?
 1929: Ship of Girls
 1930: The Copper
 1930: Bockfierfest 
 1930: 1000 Worte Deutsch 
 1931: The True Jacob
 1931: Der Geheimnis der roten Katze 
 1931: Shooting Festival in Schilda 
 1931: Schön ist die Manöverzeit 
 1931: The Office Manager
 1931: A Night at the Grand Hotel 
 1931: Zu Befehl, Herr Unteroffizier 
 1932: The Dancer of Sanssouci
 1932: Spione im Savoy-Hotel 
 1932: Thea Roland
 1933: Two Good Comrades 
 1938: Night Alone

Bibliography 
 Kay Weniger: 'Es wird im Leben dir mehr genommen als gegeben …'. Lexikon der aus Deutschland und Österreich emigrierten Filmschaffenden 1933 bis 1945. Eine Gesamtübersicht. p. 526, ACABUS Verlag, Hamburg 2011,

External links 
 —shows false birthplace and birth year
 Photographs and literature—shows false birthplace and birth year
 —shows false birthplace

1903 births
1994 deaths
German film actresses
German silent film actresses
German stage actresses
Emigrants from Nazi Germany to the United Kingdom
20th-century German actresses